Bhushangad is a hill fort in the Khatav taluk of the Satara district of Maharashtra, India.

The fort was originally built by Singhan II (1210–1247 CE) of the Devagiri Yadavs, with the exact date of its construction not known. However, Gharge-Desai (Deshmukh) Rajas of Nimsod State ruled it and so it is usually attributed to them. The nearest fort is 5 miles (8 kilometres) away.

The fort is home to the only temple of Haranaidevi (an incarnation of Durga), who is revered by the Kulkarnis clan. There is also a temple dedicated to Maruti.

References

See also
List of forts in Maharashtra

Forts in Satara district